Sue Shink is an American politician who currently represents Michigan's 14th Senate district in the Michigan Senate. She was elected in the 2022 Michigan Senate election. She is a member of the Democratic Party.

Political career
Shink started her political career as a trustee of Northfield Township. She was then elected as a Democrat to the Washtenaw County Board of Commissioners in 2018, and re-elected in 2020.

Michigan Senate
Shink ran for Michigan's 14th Senate district in the 2022 Michigan Senate election. The district had been redrawn to include parts of Jackson County and Washtenaw County, and voted for Democrat Joe Biden in 2020 by around 10 percentage points. Shink won the election over Republican Tim Golding with around 56% of the vote. The election was the most expensive race in Washtenaw County in 2022.

Electoral history

References

External links

Living people
County commissioners in Michigan
Democratic Party Michigan state senators
Women state legislators in Michigan
Politicians from Ann Arbor, Michigan
21st-century American politicians
21st-century American women politicians
Year of birth missing (living people)